"Big Blue" is a song by American indie pop band Vampire Weekend. It was the second single from their fourth studio album Father of the Bride, and was released on March 6, 2019 by Columbia Records as a double A-side with "Sunflower".

Composition
The guitars on the track have been compared to those of the Beatles' guitarist George Harrison, while the sparse electronic backdrop has been likened to Kanye West's 808s & Heartbreak (2008).

Critical reception
The song received mostly positive reception from critics, with some criticisms of its short length. Eric Krebs of The Yale Herald praised Big Blue for its sound, saying of the song, "It’s sweet — maybe a bit sugary — and it feels like someone thawed and diced a track or two from their last album, Modern Vampires of the City, threw in some sunshine for flavor, and pureed it in their NutriBullet," but noted its brevity, stating it "just doesn't quite satisfy." Will Gottsegen of Spin gave the track a positive review, stating that it "feels fully realized," but also noted of the song's length, saying, "At less than two minutes, it’s a concise counter to the decidedly knottier 'Sunflower.'"

Personnel
Credits adapted from Father of the Bride's liner notes.

 Ariel Rechtshaid – engineering, mixing
 Chris Kasych – engineering
 John DeBold – engineering
 Hiroya Takayama – engineering
 Takemasa Kosaka – engineering
 Emily Lazar – mastering
 Chris Allgood – mastering assistance

Charts

References

2019 songs
2019 singles
Vampire Weekend songs
Songs written by Ezra Koenig
Song recordings produced by Ariel Rechtshaid
Song recordings produced by DJ Dahi
Columbia Records singles